Byzantino-Slavic wars or Slavo-Byzantine wars may refer to:

 Byzantino-Bulgarian wars, wars between Byantines and Bulgarians 
 Byzantino-Rusian wars (disambiguation), wars between Byantines and Rusians
 Byzantino-Serbian wars, wars between Byantines and Serbs

See also
 Byzantine (disambiguation)
 Slavic (disambiguation)